Kim E. Rudd (born 1957) is a Canadian politician and entrepreneur elected to the House of Commons of Canada to represent the riding of Northumberland - Peterborough South in the 2015 Canadian federal election. She ran for reelection and was defeated in the 2019 Canadian federal election by more than 2,500 votes.

Rudd is past president and owner of Willis College in Cobourg, co-founder of Cook School Day Care, and a past president of the Cobourg Chamber of Commerce.

Political career 
Kim Rudd served as Parliamentary Secretary to the Minister of Natural Resources alongside being MP for Northumberland-Peterborough South from 2015-2018 when she announced she chose to step down to better represent her riding.  While stepping down from Parliamentary Secretary, Rudd declared she would not be ruling out future opportunities for more responsibility in future government.

On October 1, 2019, Kim Rudd was named the chair of the Parliamentary Health Research Caucus and will serve as a member of the standing committee on finance.

Personal life 
Rudd is currently married to husband, Tom Rudd, with whom she has two daughters, Alison and Stefanie.

Before becoming involved in politics as a career, Rudd was a long-time advocate of childcare and previously worked on the creation of daycares in Cobourg.

In 2011, Rudd was among six award recipients of the RBC Canadian Women Entrepreneur Award. Contributions to economies locally, nationally, and globally were among the criteria for winning the award.

After the 2019 Canadian federal election, Rudd became a Consultant at the Canadian Nuclear Association.

In 2020, Rudd joined the Advisory Board for Arnprior Aerospace Inc.

Electoral record

References

Liberal Party of Canada MPs
Living people
Members of the House of Commons of Canada from Ontario
Women members of the House of Commons of Canada
21st-century Canadian politicians
21st-century Canadian women politicians
1957 births